Cross Green is a mainly industrial area of Leeds, West Yorkshire, England. The area lies in the LS9 Leeds postcode area between Osmondthorpe, Richmond Hill and Hunslet.

Leeds RERF

An area north of Pontefract Lane formerly housed the main Leeds wholesale markets, one for meat, one for fish, fruit and vegetables. This was redeveloped into a facility for converting household waste into energy which opened in April 2016, and handles all the black bag bin waste from Leeds. This is called the Leeds Recycling and Energy Recovery Facility (RERF), and is operated by Veolia. The main building itself is distinctive in appearance, because of its arched timber beam construction and a Green wall on the South side, and won the Project of the Year award at the Structural Timber Awards 2015.<ref name=YPDec2015.

Residential Area
This consists of 450 homes, largely traditional terraced and back-to-back houses on Cross Green Lane and streets north of it. It is home to Leeds GATE (Gypsy And Traveller Exchange). A school, Cross Green Comprehensive School, became Copperfields College, but has now been demolished.

The Anglican Church of St Hilda and its vicarage are both Grade II Listed Buildings.  It is a red brick church by J. T. Micklethwaite, dating from 1881.

Notable people
It was the birthplace in 1942 of the poet Barry Tebb.

See also
Listed buildings in Leeds (Burmantofts and Richmond Hill Ward)

References

Places in Leeds